Mussulo (Portuguese: Ilha do Mussulo) is a peninsula and a commune, with a population of 7,798 (2014), located south of Luanda, Angola. It is part of the municipality of Belas, province of Luanda. It is actually a spit created by sediments from the Cuanza River, moved north by the Benguela Current. It is about 30 km long, at most 3 km wide, and at the narrowest parts in the south of the peninsula, less than 100 metres. 

Mussulo is linked to land at the Ponta das Palmeirinhas, the westernmost point of Luanda province. 

The peninsula forms the Mussulo bay with three islands in it. 

Mussulo is a favorite beach for Luandans with huts and restaurants at the bay beach facing the land. The outer beach to the Atlantic Ocean is hardly visited because of the strong sea current and high waves.

Administrative divisions
The Commune of Mussulo is made up of six neighborhoods as follows:
 Ponta da Barra
 Contra Costa da Ponta da Barra
 Priori
 Macoco
 Cambaxi
 Mussulo Centro
 Contra Costa do Mussulo Centro

References

External links

 Official Government Page
 Angola Market about Mussulo
 United States of America Embassy of the Republic of Angola

Communes in Luanda Province
Populated places in Luanda Province
Tourist attractions in Angola